The table contains songs recorded by The Who from 1964 to 2019.

Songs

References

External links
 Official Discography
 The Who BMI Repertoire
 The Who ASCAP Repertoire

 
Who, The
Who